Nelson Sossa Chávez (born March 14, 1986 in La Paz) is a Bolivian football striker who currently plays in the Liga de Fútbol Profesional Boliviano for Real Potosí.

Sossa began playing professional football in 2004 when club  Jorge Wilstermann promoted him from its youth sector. After five successful years playing for the aviadores he was transferred to fierce rival Aurora, which was in need of talented players to face the 2009 edition of Copa Libertadores.

Bolivia national team
Sossa has capped for the Bolivia national team in three games with one goal scored. He was also a member of the Bolivian squad during Copa America 2007.

References
Base de Datos del Fútbol Argentino

External links
 

1986 births
Living people
Footballers from La Paz
Bolivian footballers
Bolivia international footballers
2007 Copa América players
C.D. Jorge Wilstermann players
Club Aurora players

Association football forwards